Arctosuchus is an extinct genus of gorgonopsid from the Lopingian (Permian). The type species, A. tigrinus, is from the Teekloof Formation (Tropidostoma Assemblage Zone),  although a second species, A. buceros, from the Wolfville Formation (Upper Wolfville Member) of Nova Scotia, Canada, may also belong to the genus, but it is from the Triassic and it probably instead belongs to an indeterminate synapsid.

The type and only specimen of A. tigrinus consists of a fragmentary skull and fragmentary dentary. The remains of A. buceros are unknown and are possibly now lost.

See also

 List of therapsids

References

Gorgonopsia
Prehistoric therapsid genera
Lopingian synapsids of Africa
Fossil taxa described in 1911
Taxa named by Robert Broom